Donnell Holmes (born January 3, 1973) is an American former professional boxer who competed from 2003 to 2012.

Career
Holmes had an amateur record of 73-13 (64 KOs) before turning professional in January 2003, winning his first fight at The Hilton in Wilmington, North Carolina in which Holmes beat fellow American fighter Johan Carrington.

He was promoted by Gary Shaw after leaving Don King.

He fought Brian Minto for the interim WBO NABO Heavyweight Title and Minto's WBA Fedecentro Heavyweight Title on August 14, 2009 in which he lost by a technical decision after the fight was stopped after four rounds all the judges had Minto leading so Minto was declared the winner and it was also the first loss of Holmes career.

References

External links
 
 Homepage

1973 births
Living people
Heavyweight boxers
Boxers from North Carolina
People from Sampson County, North Carolina
American male boxers
African-American boxers
21st-century African-American sportspeople
20th-century African-American sportspeople